Michael Porrini (born March 2, 1989) is a retired American professional basketball player. He is the head coach of the Ohio Cardinals of the North American Premier Basketball (NAPB).

College career 
On March 8, 2011  Porrini was named MAC Defensive Player of the Year. Porrini was the fourth Kent State player to earn the award and marked the fifth Defensive Player of the Year award for Kent State (Demertic Shaw; 2001 and 2002; John Edwards, 2004; and Haminn Quaintance, 2008).

Professional career
Porrini played professionally for four seasons. In 2014 he played for Timba Timișoara in the Romania-Liga Nationala.

References

External links
Kent State Golden Flashes bio

1989 births
Living people
American expatriate basketball people in Greece
American expatriate basketball people in Romania
American expatriate basketball people in Turkey
American men's basketball coaches
American men's basketball players
Aries Trikala B.C. players
Basketball coaches from Ohio
Basketball players from Ohio
Gulf Coast State College alumni
Junior college men's basketball players in the United States
Kent State Golden Flashes men's basketball players
North American Premier Basketball coaches
Shooting guards
Sportspeople from Massillon, Ohio
Western Carolina Catamounts men's basketball players